Hendrickx is a Dutch-language surname of Belgian origin. Notable people with the surname include:

Albert Hendrickx (1916–1990), Belgian racing cyclist
Alexander Hendrickx (born 1993), Belgian field hockey player
Björn Hendrickx (born 1974), Belgian rower
Gaëtan Hendrickx (born 1995), Belgian footballer
Harrie Hendrickx, Belgian politician
Jonathan Hendrickx (born 1993), Belgian footballer
Jorik Hendrickx (born 1992), Belgian figure skater
Joris Hendrickx (born 1983), Belgian sidecarcross rider, 2009 World champion
Jules Hendrickx (1899–1973), Belgian racing cyclist
Loena Hendrickx (born 1999), Belgian figure skater
Marc Hendrickx (born 1968), Flemish politician
Marcel Hendrickx (1925–2008), Belgian racing cyclist
Marcel Hendrickx (politician) (1935–2020), Belgian politician
Monic Hendrickx (born 1966), Dutch actress
Nico Hendrickx (born 1976), Belgian archer
Sofie Hendrickx (born 1986), Belgian basketball player
Wiel Hendrickx (1908–1984), Dutch equestrian

See also 

Henderickx
Hendric
Hendrick (disambiguation)
Hendricks (disambiguation)
Hendrik (disambiguation)
Hendriks
Hendrikx
Hendrix (disambiguation)
Hendryx
Henrik
Henry (disambiguation)
Henryk (disambiguation)

Surnames of Belgian origin
Dutch-language surnames
Patronymic surnames
Surnames from given names